This list shows each country which has a union affiliated to World Rugby, the international governing body for rugby union. It also shows the number of registered clubs playing in each country, official referees and the number of registered players broken down by gender and age group. 

In 2016, the total number of registered players increased from 2.82 million to 3.2 million while the total number of non-registered rugby players rose from 4.91 million to 5.3 million. South Africa has the most registered players with 651,146 and England the most players overall with 2,139,604.

Footnotes
Notes

References

Rugy Union
Countries